Nebria nataliae is a species of ground beetle in the Nebriinae subfamily that is endemic to Kyrgyzstan.

References

nataliae
Beetles described in 1996
Beetles of Asia
Endemic fauna of Kyrgyzstan